Ubhauli (उभौली) is festival of the Kirat communities of Sunuwar, Rai, Limbu and Yakkha of Nepal , India and  around the world by Kirati people celebrated every year marking the migration phase upwards towards the hilly regions when the summer season arrives. The migration from hills downwards to areas of lower altitude is called Udhauli (downwards), which is also an annual festival of these communities. Sakela is the dance performed during the festival. On this Ubhauli festival day, the Kirat people pray to mother nature for healthy crops and protection from natural calamities in that year.

References

Festivals in Nepal
Public holidays in Nepal
Nepalese culture